The Stockton Building is a historic commercial building at 113 North Broadway in downtown Siloam Springs, Arkansas.  It is a two-story masonry structure with a pressed metal cornice that is horizontal at the outer bays and with a gabled pediment at the center.  Built in 1894, it is a distinctive yet vernacular example of late 19th-century commercial architecture, unique in the city.

The building was listed on the National Register of Historic Places in 1988.

See also
National Register of Historic Places listings in Benton County, Arkansas

References

Commercial buildings on the National Register of Historic Places in Arkansas
Buildings and structures in Siloam Springs, Arkansas
National Register of Historic Places in Benton County, Arkansas
Historic district contributing properties in Arkansas
Commercial buildings completed in 1894
1894 establishments in Arkansas